Kayoko Hashiguchi-Saka (born 26 April 1944) is a Japanese gymnast. She competed at the 1968 Summer Olympics and the 1972 Summer Olympics.

References

1944 births
Living people
Japanese female artistic gymnasts
Olympic gymnasts of Japan
Gymnasts at the 1968 Summer Olympics
Gymnasts at the 1972 Summer Olympics
Sportspeople from Miyazaki Prefecture
20th-century Japanese women